The Oxford Calculators were a group of 14th-century thinkers, almost all associated with Merton College, Oxford; for this reason they were dubbed "The Merton School". These men took a strikingly logical and mathematical approach to philosophical problems.
The key "calculators", writing in the second quarter of the 14th century, were Thomas Bradwardine, William Heytesbury, Richard Swineshead and John Dumbleton.
Using the slightly earlier works of Walter Burley, Gerard of Brussels, and Nicole Oresme, these individuals expanded upon the concepts of 'latitudes' and what real world applications they could apply them to.

Science
The advances these men made were initially purely mathematical but later became relevant to mechanics. Using Aristotelian logic and physics, they studied and attempted to quantify physical and observable characteristics such as: heat, force, color, density, and light. Aristotle believed that only length and motion were able to be quantified. But they used his philosophy and proved it untrue by being able to calculate things such as temperature and power.
They developed Al-Battani's work on trigonometry and their most famous work was the development of the mean speed theorem, (though it was later credited to Galileo) which is known as "The Law of Falling Bodies". Although they attempted to quantify these observable characteristics, their interests lay more in the philosophical and logical aspects than in natural world. They used numbers to disagree philosophically and prove the reasoning of "why" something worked the way it did and not only "how" something functioned the way that it did.

The Oxford Calculators distinguished kinematics from dynamics, emphasizing kinematics, and investigating instantaneous velocity. It is through their understanding of geometry and how different shapes could be used to represent a body in motion. The Calculators related these bodies in relative motion to geometrical shapes and also understood that right triangles area would be equivalent to a rectangles if the rectangles height was half of the triangles. This is what led to the formulating of what is known as the mean speed theorem. A basic definition of the mean speed theorem is; a body moving with constant speed will travel the same distance as an accelerated body in the same period of time as long as the body with constant speed travels at half of the sum of initial and final velocities for the accelerated body. Relative motion, also referred to as local motion, can be defined as motion relative to another object where the values for acceleration, velocity, and position are dependent upon a predetermined reference point. 

The mathematical physicist and historian of science Clifford Truesdell, wrote:

In Tractatus de proportionibus (1328), Bradwardine extended the theory of proportions of Eudoxus to anticipate the concept of exponential growth, later developed by the Bernoulli and Euler, with compound interest as a special case. Arguments for the mean speed theorem (above) require the modern concept of limit, so Bradwardine had to use arguments of his day. Mathematician and mathematical historian Carl Benjamin Boyer writes, "Bradwardine developed the Boethian theory of double or triple or, more generally, what we would call 'n-tuple' proportion".

Boyer also writes that "the works of Bradwardine had contained some fundamentals of trigonometry". Yet "Bradwardine and his Oxford colleagues did not quite make the breakthrough to modern science." The most essential missing tool was algebra.

Latitude of Forms 
The Latitude of Forms is a topic that many of the Oxford Calculators published volumes on. Developed by Nicole Orseme, a “Latitude" is an abstract concept of a range that forms may vary inside of. Before latitudes were introduced into mechanics, they were used in both medical and philosophical fields. Medical authors Galen and Avicenna can be given credit for the origin of the concept. “Galen says, for instance, that there is a latitude of health which is divided into three parts, each in turn having some latitude. First, there is the latitude of healthy bodies, second the latitude of neither health nor sickness, and third the latitude of sickness.” The calculators attempted to measure and explain these changes in latitude concretely and mathematically. John Dumbleton discusses latitudes in Part II and Part III of his work the Summa. He is critical of earlier philosophers in Part II as he believes latitudes are measurable and quantifiable and later in Part III of the Summa attempts to use latitudes to measure local motion. Roger Swineshead defines five latitudes for local motion being: First, the latitude of local motion, Second, the latitude of velocity of local motion, Third, the latitude of slowness of the local motion, Fourth, the latitude of the acquisition of the latitude of local motion, and the Fifth being, the latitude of the loss of the latitude of local motion. Each of these latitudes are infinite and are comparable to the velocity, acceleration, and deceleration of the local motion of an object.

Thomas Bradwardine
Thomas Bradwardine was born in 1290 in Sussex, England. An attending student educated at Balliol College, Oxford, he earned various degrees. He was a secular cleric, a scholar, a theologist, a mathematician, and a physicist. He became chancellor of the diocese of London and Dean of St Paul's, as well as chaplain and confessor to Edward III. During his time at Oxford, he authored many books including: De Geometria Speculativa (printed in Paris, 1530), De Arithmetica Practica (printed in Paris, 1502), and De Proportionibus Velocitatum in Motibus (printed in Paris in 1495). Bradwardine furthered the study of using mathematics to explain physical reality. Drawing on the work of Robert Grosseteste, Robert Kilwardby and Roger Bacon. His work was in direct opposition to William of Ockham.

Aristotle suggested that velocity was proportional to force and inversely proportional to resistance, doubling the force would double the velocity but doubling the resistance would halve the velocity (V ∝ F/R). Bradwardine objected saying that this is not observed because the velocity does not equal zero when the resistance exceeds the force. Instead, he proposed a new theory that, in modern terms, would be written as (V ∝ log F/R), which was widely accepted until the late sixteenth century.

William Heytesbury
William Heytesbury was a bursar at Merton until the late 1330s and he administered the college properties in Northumberland. Later in his life he was a chancellor of Oxford. He was the first to discover the mean-speed theorem, later "The Law of Falling Bodies". Unlike Bradwardine's theory, the theorem, also known as "The Merton Rule" is a probable truth.
His most noted work was Regulae Solvendi Sophismata (Rules for Solving Sophisms). Sophisma is a statement which one can argue to be both true and false. The resolution of these arguments and determination of the real state of affairs forces one to deal with logical matters such as the analysis of the meaning of the statement in question, and the application of logical rules to specific cases. An example would be the statement, "The compound H2O is both a solid and a liquid". When the temperature is low enough this statement is true. But it may be argued and proven false at a higher temperature. In his time, this work was logically advanced.
He was a second generation calculator. He built on Richard Klivingston's "Sophistimata and Bradwardine's "Insolubilia". Later, his work went on to influence Peter of Mantura and Paul of Venice.

Richard Swineshead
Richard Swineshead was also an English mathematician, logician, and natural philosopher. The sixteenth-century polymath Girolamo Cardano placed him in the top-ten intellects of all time, alongside Archimedes, Aristotle, and Euclid.
He became a member of the Oxford calculators in 1344. His main work was a series of treatises written in 1350. This work earned him the title of "The Calculator". His treatises were named Liber Calculationum, which means "Book of Calculations". His book dealt in exhaustive detail with quantitative physics and he had over fifty variations of Bradwardine's law.

John Dumbleton
John Dumbleton became a member of the calculators in 1338–39. After becoming a member, he left the calculators for a brief period of time to study theology in Paris in 1345–47. After his study there he returned to his work with the calculators in 1347–48. One of his main pieces of work, Summa logicae et philosophiae naturalis, focused on explaining the natural world in a coherent and realistic manner, unlike some of his colleagues, claiming that they were making light of serious endeavors. Dumbleton attempted many solutions to the latitude of things, most were refuted by Richard Swineshead in his Liber Calculationum.

See also
 Jean Buridan  
 John Cantius 
 Gerard of Brussels 
 Henry of Langenstein    
 Scholasticism  
 Science in the Middle Ages  
 Domingo de Soto

Notes

References 
 Weisheipl, James A. (1959) "The Place of John Dumbleton in the Merton School"
Clagett, Marshall (1964) “Nicole Oresme and Medieval Scientific Thought.” Proceedings of the American Philosophical Society
Sylla, Edith D. (1973) "MEDIEVAL CONCEPTS OF THE LATITUDE OF FORMS: THE OXFORD CALCULATORS"
Sylla, Edith D. (1999) "Oxford Calculators", in The Cambridge Dictionary of Philosophy.
 Gavroglu, Kostas; Renn, Jurgen (2007) "Positioning the History of Science".
 Agutter, Paul S.; Wheatley, Denys N. (2008) "Thinking About Life"

Further reading 
 Carl B. Boyer (1949), The History of Calculus and Its Conceptual Development, New York: Hafner, reprinted in 1959, New York:  Dover. 
 John Longeway, (2003), "William Heytesbury", in The Stanford Encyclopedia of Philosophy.  Accessed 2012 January 3. 
Uta C. Merzbach and Carl B. Boyer (2011), A History of Mathematics", Third Edition, Hoboken, NJ:  Wiley.   
 Edith Sylla (1982), "The Oxford Calculators", in Norman Kretzmann, Anthony Kenny, and Jan Pinborg, edd. The Cambridge History of Later Medieval Philosophy: From the Rediscovery of Aristotle to the Disintegration of Scholasticism, 1100-1600'', New York:  Cambridge.

History of philosophy
History of physics
14th-century English mathematicians
14th-century philosophers
Merton College, Oxford
History of the University of Oxford
14th century in science
14th-century English writers